The Minnesota State Patrol is the primary state patrol agency for Minnesota and serves as the de facto state police for the state. While Minnesota State Patrol troopers have full powers of arrest throughout the state, their primary function is traffic safety and vehicle law enforcement. The State Patrol is a division of the Minnesota Department of Public Safety.

History
The Minnesota Highway Patrol was created in 1929 when Charles M. Babcock, the Commissioner of Highways, appointed Earle Brown, Sheriff of Hennepin County, as Chief of the Highway Patrol.  On July 1, 1929, Chief Brown appointed 8 officers. In 1973 the Highway Patrol was reorganized and the official name was changed to the Minnesota State Patrol.

The first training school was held January 18 to April 1, 1930.  This school graduated the first 35 members of the Minnesota Highway Patrol.

The patch
The patch worn by members of the Minnesota State Patrol evolved from "The Great Seal" which is placed on all official state documents.

Notable incidents

According to Bellingcat the Minnesota State Patrol was among the police departments which deliberately targeted journalists during the George Floyd protests.
In late May 2020, the Minnesota State Patrol was involved in policing the George Floyd protests in Minneapolis–Saint Paul. The State Patrol slashed tires of at least several dozen unoccupied vehicles parked near protests, admitting their involvement around a week later. Several journalists' cars, including from the Star Tribune, had their tires slashed. The Patrol said that the tactic was not a usual one, but they implemented it to prevent vehicles from being used as weapons.

Duties

While the State Patrol concentrates primarily on traffic enforcement and highway safety it also has a statewide law enforcement role. Troopers are also involved with crash reconstruction and commercial vehicle enforcement. The State Patrol capitol security division also handles the security for the Minnesota State Capitol complex and the Governor. Additionally, the State Patrol maintains a K-9 unit that focuses on drug enforcement interdiction, as well as a Special Response Team (SRT), that operates like a traditional SWAT Team. Troopers are issued the Glock 17 Gen 5 9mm sidearm.

Organization
The State Patrol is headquartered in St. Paul. There are 11 Patrol Districts throughout the state, with 61 Patrol Stations. The current State Patrol Chief is Colonel Matthew Langer. Each district office is led by a Captain and is staffed with troopers and investigators, along with communication and support staff to assist in the patrol's missions. The Headquarters and State Patrol Command Staff are within District 2000, along with the Flight Section, Investigative Services Section, and Training & Development.

Patrol Districts

State Patrol Chief
Since 1929, the State Patrol has been commanded by the State Patrol Chief, who has the rank of Colonel. The Colonel reports directly to the Minnesota Commissioner of Public Safety, who is appointed by the governor and serves in the Governor's Cabinet. In 1997, Anne L. Beers was appointed Chief of the State Patrol, as the first woman to hold the rank of Commander of a State Police Agency in U.S. The following is a list of those that have held the title of State Patrol Chief:

Rank structure 

Note: Each state patrol district station has 1 sergeant who oversees all station operations. The official field supervisors throughout the district are lieutenants.

Fallen troopers
Since the establishment of the Minnesota State Patrol, eight troopers have died while on duty.

See also

 List of law enforcement agencies in Minnesota
 State police
 State patrol
 Highway patrol

References

External links
  Minnesota State Patrol (Official site)
  Minnesota State Patrol Trooper's Association
 Officer Down Memorial Page - Minnesota State Patrol
 MaroonCruisers.com - MN State Patrol Cruiser History website

State law enforcement agencies of Minnesota
Government agencies established in 1929
1929 establishments in Minnesota